SkyValue, formally known as SkyValue USA, was a seasonal American low-cost airline that was headquartered in Fort Lauderdale, Florida, and for the 2006–07 winter season, its only season of operations, operated from a hub at Gary/Chicago International Airport (GYY) in Gary, Indiana, which lies 25 miles southeast of the Chicago Loop.

History 
On October 13, 2006, Sky Value USA, part of C First Class Corp.brand, announced that it would begin flights on 737-800 aircraft beginning December from Gary/Chicago International Airport to five "sunny" locations offering 5 flights a day.. Service from December 15, 2006, to April 2007 was offered as a test run, with service to continue if it was proved successful. The winter season was extremely successful with over 10,000 passengers which made possible federal grants awarded to support the cost and expansion of the Gary Airport to become Chicago's "3rd" airport.  SkyValue was operated as a "scheduled charter" service, with aircraft wet leased from Xtra Airways

The tour operator added a third weekly flight from its hub at Gary/Chicago International Airport to the airline's most popular destination, Mesa, Arizona which is located in the Phoenix area.

On April 27, 2007, SkyValue's CEO announced they would be ending service as planned to all destinations on May 6, 2007, and would consider providing the service for the next season.

Destinations 

During the 2006–07 winter season, SkyValue flew to five destinations in the United States.

United States

Arizona 
Phoenix/Mesa (Phoenix-Mesa Gateway Airport) winter-only seasonal service

Florida 
Orlando (Orlando International Airport) 
St. Petersburg/Clearwater (St. Petersburg-Clearwater International Airport)

Indiana 
Gary (Gary/Chicago International Airport) Hub

Nevada 
Las Vegas (McCarran International Airport)

Schedule 
During its only year of operation, SkyValue operated the following schedule:

Fleet 
When SkyValue began scheduled passenger service on December 15, 2006, they originally operated a Boeing 737-800 aircraft which was wet leased from Xtra Airways. The airline kept this aircraft until April 23, 2007, when the 737-800 (in all economy class configuration) was returned to Xtra Airways for a smaller Boeing 737-400 aircraft (in a business/economy class configuration). SkyValue has optioned for a year-long lease on the 737-400 which expired in April 2008.

See also 
 List of defunct airlines of the United States

References

External links
SkyValue Official Website
SkyValue Routes
Sky Value Limited Official Website
Xtra Airways Official Website

Defunct airlines of the United States
Defunct low-cost airlines
Airlines established in 2006
Airlines disestablished in 2007
Companies based in Fort Lauderdale, Florida
Defunct companies based in Florida